The 2022 season of the 4. divisjon, the fifth highest association football league for men in Norway.

Due to the receding COVID-19 pandemic in Norway, some changes from the previous years were reverted. Indre Østland, Agder, Sogn og Fjordane changed from two groups to one; Hordaland and Trøndelag from four groups to two.

Finnmark introduced a regular/playoff format. The 8 teams played a round-robin tournament, whereafter the top 4 would play each other off and the bottom 4 do the same, retaining all points from the regular season. The playoffs were similar to championship rounds and relegation rounds from other leagues, but were named playoff A and playoff B, respectively.

Teams 

Østfold
Råde – lost playoff
Kråkerøy
Drøbak-Frogn
Kvik Halden 2
Sarpsborg
Østsiden
Borgen
Sparta Sarpsborg
Moss 2
Lisleby
Rakkestad
Tistedalen
Greåker
Ås

Oslo 1
KFUM 2 − promoted
Gamle Oslo
Holmen
Bærum 2
Manglerud Star
Oppsal 2
Oldenborg
Asker 2
Lommedalen
Oslojuvelene
Hasle-Løren
Gui

Oslo 2
Ullern 2 − promoted
Holmlia
Årvoll
Heming
Stovner
Fagerborg
Christiania
Kolbotn
Rilindja
Lyn 2
Veitvet
Nesodden

Akershus
Skedsmo − promoted
Ull/Kisa 2
Raumnes & Årnes
Gjelleråsen 2
Hauerseter
Eidsvold
Sørumsand
Aurskog-Høland
Kløfta
Lørenskog 2
Rælingen
Eidsvold Turn 2
Strømmen 2
Gjerdrum

Indre Østland
Ham-Kam 2 − promoted
Kolbukameratene
Faaberg
Nybergsund
Ottestad
Brumunddal 2
Gjøvik-Lyn 2
Gran
Furnes
Løten
Elverum 2
Engerdal
Reinsvoll
Sander

Buskerud
Åskollen − won playoff
Drammens BK
Åssiden
Vestfossen
Hallingdal
Modum
Eiker/Kvikk
Svelvik
Konnerud
Huringen
Jevnaker
Sande
ROS
Kongsberg

Vestfold
Sandefjord 2 − won playoff
Flint
Sandefjord BK
Eik Tønsberg 2
Ørn-Horten 2
Teie
Re
Nøtterøy
Stag/Fram 2
Stokke
Husøy & Foynland
Larvik Turn

Telemark
Hei – lost playoff
Stathelle og Omegn
Tollnes
Odd 3
Storm
Pors 2
Eidanger
Notodden 2
Skarphedin
Gulset
Nome
Snøgg – pulled team

Agder
Donn − promoted
Trauma
Våg
Vigør
Jerv 2
Lyngdal
Søgne
Fløy 2
Torridal
Vindbjart 2
Froland
Hisøy
Rygene
Kvinesdal – pulled team

Rogaland 1
Eiger − promoted
Hinna
Riska
Forus og Gausel
Ålgård
Bryne 2
Randaberg
Hana
Stavanger
Hundvåg
Sola 2
Egersund 2
Sunde
Sokndal

Rogaland 2
Madla − promoted
Varhaug
Rosseland
Frøyland
Vardeneset
Nord
Vard Haugesund 2
Vidar 2
Kopervik
Klepp
Djerv 1919 2
Skjold
Tasta
Lura – pulled team

Hordaland 1
Loddefjord − promoted
Askøy
Varegg
Nymark
Austevoll
Sund
Lyngbø
Sotra 2
NHHI
Trott
Østsiden Askøy
Fyllingsdalen 2

Hordaland 2
Gneist − promoted
Voss
Åsane 2
Arna-Bjørnar
Osterøy
Tertnes
Nordhordland
Flaktveit
Fana 2
Øystese
Os 2
Bergen Nord

Sogn og Fjordane
Sogndal 2 − promoted
Årdal
Fjøra
Eid
Stryn
Høyang
Førde 2
Studentspretten
Måløy
Vik
Bremanger
Jølster

Sunnmøre
Herd – lost playoff
Bergsøy
Rollon
SIF/Hessa
Norborg/Brattvåg 2
Hovdebygda
Ørsta
Hareid
Blindheim
Langevåg
Emblem
Larsnes/Gursken/Gjerdsvika

Nordmøre og Romsdal
Kristiansund 2 − won playoff
Surnadal
Tomrefjord
Sunndal
Dahle
Træff 2
Eide og Omegn
Vestnes Varfjell
Midsund
Åndalsnes
Malmefjorden
Kristiansund FK/Clausenengen

Trøndelag 1
Verdal − promoted
NTNUI
Flatanger
Vuku
Levanger 2
Sverresborg
Stjørdals-Blink 2
Rørvik
Kvik
Namsos
Byåsen 2
Kolstad 2 – pulled team

Trøndelag 2
Trønder-Lyn − promoted
Ranheim 2
Heimdal
Strindheim 2
KIL/Hemne
Hitra
Tynset
Orkla 2
Buvik
Nardo 2
Charlottenlund
Svorkmo

Nordland
Mosjøen − won playoff
Grand Bodø
Fauske/Sprint
Sandnessjøen
Bodø/Glimt 3
Rana 2
Meløy
Bossmo & Ytteren
Junkeren 2
Mo – pulled team

Hålogaland
Skånland − won playoff
Landsås
Medkila
Melbo
Lofoten
Sortland
Morild
Andenes
Leknes
Ballstad

Troms
Hamna – lost playoff
Skarp
Finnsnes
Ishavsbyen
Tromsdalen 2
Krokelvdalen
Storelva
Salangen
Ulfstind
Lyngen/Karnes
Valhall
Kvaløya

Finnmark
HIF/Stein
Alta 2
Nordlys
Porsanger
Kirkenes
Norild
Sørøy Glimt
Honningsvåg

Finnmark playoff A
HIF/Stein − won playoff
Alta 2
Nordlys
Porsanger

Finnmark playoff B
Kirkenes
Norild
Sørøy Glimt
Honningsvåg

Playoffs
Sandefjord 2 beat Råde.
Åskollen beat Hei.
Kristiansund 2 beat Herd.
Mosjøen beat Skånland.
HIF/Stein beat Hamna.
Skånland beat Hamna

References

5
Norway
Norway
Norwegian Fourth Division seasons